Anolis antonii, the San Antonio anole or Anton's anole, is a species of lizard in the family Dactyloidae. The species is found in Colombia.

References

Anoles
Reptiles of Colombia
Endemic fauna of Colombia
Reptiles described in 1908
Taxa named by George Albert Boulenger